Maureen Peters (3 March 1935 – 8 April 2008) was a historical novelist, under her own name and pseudonyms such as Veronica Black, Catherine Darby, Belinda Gray, Levanah Lloyd, Judith Rothman, Elizabeth Law and Sharon Whitby.

Personal life
She was born in Caernarvon, North Wales. She was educated at grammar school and attended the University College of North Wales, Bangor, where she obtained a Bachelor of Arts degree and a diploma of Education. For some time she taught disabled children, and then took up writing. She has produced many books and contributed short stories to many magazines.

Peters is also known as a Bronte scholar.

Maureen Peters was married and divorced twice; she had a son and two daughters.

She died on 8 April 2008.

Writing  career
Her novels have often focused on royalty, mostly the War of the Roses and Tudor period, and cover the lives of Elizabeth I of England, Anne Boleyn, Catherine Howard, Mary Tudor, Queen of France, as well as of other famous and less famous historical figures such as Edward II of England, the many Queen consorts of various Kings of England. Apart from biographical fiction on royalty (written under her own name), she also wrote Gothic romances, family sagas, Mills & Boon series titles, contemporary mysteries.

Bibliography

As Maureen Peters

Series

References

1935 births
2008 deaths
Welsh historical novelists
Alumni of Bangor University
Women historical novelists
Writers of historical fiction set in the Middle Ages
Writers of historical fiction set in the early modern period
People from Caernarfon